Palparara Station is a pastoral lease that operates as a cattle station in the outback of Queensland.

Farrar's Creek flows through the property between the Barcoo and Thomson Rivers. It once adjoined Davenport Downs, Monkira, Morney Plains, Currawilla and Connemara Stations.

History
The property was established at some time prior to 1878 when it was put up for auction by the owners Messrs Caswell and Hughes.

The area was extensively flooded in 1906 with much of Palparara, owned by Dalgety and Co., being under  of water. Kidman sold the property in 1910 to Edmund Jowett.

By 1936, the property was being managed by Mr. Corrigan and was later put up for auction by the estate of Edmund Jowett. The property attracted no bids. The property realised £11,500 including 3,500 head of cattle. It had been acquired by Kidman interests.

Properties in the area were having a good season even though the feed did not seem so abundant.

See also
List of ranches and stations

References

Pastoral leases in Queensland
Stations (Australian agriculture)
Central West Queensland